Sweet Genius was an American reality-based cooking television series on the Food Network. The series was hosted by pastry chef Ron Ben-Israel. The premise of the show pitted four chefs, of confectionery and pastry, against one another to compete for a chance to win $10,000 based on the creativity and taste of each dish. The first season premiered on September 22, 2011. Season two debuted on March 15, 2012. Season 3 premiered on October 18, 2012, ending on January 24, 2013.

Format
Similar to the format of the show Chopped, four chefs compete in separate rounds with mandatory ingredients. After each round, a chef is eliminated from the competition. What differentiates it from Chopped is that they also must include an inspiration. In Season 1, the rounds were divided into challenges to create Frozen, Baked and Chocolate desserts and also an electronic voice told them their inspiration and ingredients for the round. In the following seasons, the format was changed to Chocolate, Candy and Cake and the electronic voice was taken out.

At the beginning of each round, Chef Ben-Israel reveals the first mandatory ingredient followed by an inspiration. The second mandatory ingredient is revealed at the halfway point of each round. On rare occasions, a third ingredient is introduced. The time limit goes from 40 minutes in the first round, 50 minutes in the second round, and then an hour in the final round. After each round, Chef Ben-Israel tastes and evaluates each dessert. The loser of the round is revealed when Chef Ben-Israel formally tells the contestant, "You were no sweet genius."

Series Overview

Episodes
All episode titles ended with the word "Genius".

Season 1 (2011)

Season 2 (2012)

Season 3 (2012-2013)

References

External links
 Official Page

2011 in American television
2010s American cooking television series
2011 American television series debuts
English-language television shows
Cooking competitions in the United States
Food Network original programming
2013 American television series endings